Tiny Creatures is a 2020 pseudo-documentary that depicts fictional stories starring nature's tiny creatures. Despite the fact that the series' events and sets are largely staged and scripted, it is advertised as a documentary by Netflix.

Episodes

Release 
Tiny Creatures was released on August 7, 2020 on Netflix.

References

External links 
 
 

2020s American documentary television series
2020 American television series debuts
English-language Netflix original programming
Netflix original documentary television series
Television series about birds
Television series about mammals